Line 3 of the Shijiazhuang Metro is a rapid transit line in Shijiazhuang. It was officially open on 26 June 2017. The line is currently 26.7 km long with 22 stations.

Opening timeline

Stations

References

03
Railway lines opened in 2017